is a Japanese politician serving in the House of Representatives in the Diet (national legislature) as a member of the Liberal Democratic Party.

Early life and education 
Toida was born and raised in  Edogawa, Tokyo. He graduate with a degree from Dokkyo University.

Career 
Toida was first elected in 1996.

Right-wing positions
He was a supporter of right-wing filmmaker Satoru Mizushima's 2007  film The Truth about Nanjing, which denied that the Nanking Massacre ever occurred.

References

External links
   Official website

Living people
1951 births
People from Edogawa, Tokyo
Liberal Democratic Party (Japan) politicians
Members of the House of Representatives (Japan)
Nanjing Massacre deniers
21st-century Japanese politicians
Dokkyo University alumni